Leon Marcus Uris (August 3, 1924 – June 21, 2003) was an American author of historical fiction who wrote many bestselling books including Exodus (published in 1958) and Trinity (published in 1976).

Life and career
Uris was born in Baltimore, Maryland, the son of Jewish American parents Wolf William and Anna (née Blumberg) Uris. His father, a Polish-born immigrant, was a paperhanger, then a storekeeper. His mother was first-generation Russian American. William spent a year in Palestine after World War I before entering the United States. He derived his last name from Yerushalmi, meaning "man of Jerusalem". (His brother Aron, Leon's uncle, took the name Yerushalmi.) "He was basically a failure", Uris later said of his father. "I think his personality was formed by the harsh realities of being a Jew in Czarist Russia. I think failure formed his character, made him bitter."

At age six, Uris reportedly wrote an operetta inspired by the death of his dog. He attended schools in Norfolk, Virginia, and Baltimore, but never graduated from high school, and failed English three times. When he was 17 and in his senior year of high school, the Japanese attacked Pearl Harbor and he enlisted in the United States Marine Corps. He served in the South Pacific with the 2nd Battalion, 6th Marines Regiment, where he was stationed in New Zealand, and fought as a radioman in combat on Guadalcanal and Tarawa from 1942 through 1944. He was sent to the US after suffering from dengue fever, malaria and a recurrence of asthma that made him miss the devastation of his battalion at the Battle of Saipan, which was featured in Battle Cry. While recuperating from malaria in San Francisco, he met Betty Beck, a Marine sergeant; they married in 1945.

Released from service he worked for a newspaper, and wrote in his spare time. Esquire magazine bought an article in 1950, and he began to devote himself to writing more seriously. Drawing on his experiences in Guadalcanal and Tarawa, he produced the best-selling Battle Cry, a novel depicting the toughness and courage of U.S. Marines in the Pacific. He then went to Warner Brothers in Hollywood helping to write the eponymous movie which was extremely popular with the public, but not the critics. He went on to write The Angry Hills, a novel set in war-time Greece.

His best-known work may be Exodus, which was published in 1958. Most sources indicate that Uris, motivated by an intense interest in Israel, financed his research for the novel by selling the film rights in advance to MGM and by writing newspaper articles about the Sinai campaign,<ref>[http://www.ncsj.org/AuxPages/062503NYTimes_Uris.shtml Leon Uris,  78, Who Wrote Sweeping Novels Like "Exodus," Dies]  New York Times – June 25, 2003</ref>  which is said to have involved two years of research, and thousands of interviews. It was a worldwide best-seller, translated into a dozen languages, and was made into a feature film in 1960, starring Paul Newman, directed by Otto Preminger, as well as into a short-lived Broadway musical, Ari, in 1971, for which Uris wrote the book and lyrics.Exodus illustrated the history of Palestine from the late 19th century through the founding of the state of Israel in 1948. Exodus was also extraordinarily influential among Russian Refuseniks. Two typewritten Russian translations were circulated as samizdat – illegal, hand-copied works that were passed secretly from hand to hand – and the story was retold orally in the prison camps, with the oral version eventually being written in a notebook which was passed from one generation of prisoners to the next.

Uris's 1967 novel Topaz was adapted for the screen and directed by Alfred Hitchcock in 1969. His subsequent works included Mila 18, about the Warsaw ghetto uprising; Armageddon: A Novel of Berlin, a chronicle which ends with the lifting of the Berlin Blockade in 1949; Trinity, about Irish nationalism, and the sequel, Redemption, covering the early 20th century and World War I.QB VII, about the role of a Polish doctor in a German concentration camp, is a dramatic four-part courtroom novel published in 1970, highlighting the events leading to a libel trial in the United Kingdom. It is loosely based on a court case for defamation (Dering v Uris) that arose from Uris's earlier best-selling novel Exodus, and was Uris's second consecutive #1 New York Times Best Seller. The Haj was set in the history of the Middle East. He also wrote the screenplays for Battle Cry and Gunfight at the O.K. Corral.

His work on the subject of Israel has been criticized for being biased against Arabs.

 Personal life 
Uris was married three times. His first wife was Betty Beck, whom he married in 1945. They had three children before divorcing in 1968. He then married Marjorie Edwards in 1968, who committed suicide by gunshot the following year.

His third and last wife was photographer Jill Peabody, daughter of Frances Gleason and Alfred Peabody of Boston. They had two children, Rachel and Conor. They married in 1970, when she was 22 years old and he was 45. He and wife Jill worked together on his book Ireland: A Terrible Beauty, for which she provided illustrations and on Jerusalem: A Song of Songs. They divorced in 1988, and soon after Uris settled in New York City.

Death
Leon Uris died of kidney failure at his Long Island home on Shelter Island in 2003, aged 78. His papers can be found at the Harry Ransom Center, University of Texas in Austin, where the University of Texas Press published a literary biography about him. The collection includes all of Uris's novels, with the exception of The Haj and Mitla Pass, as well as manuscripts for the screenplay, Gunfight at the O.K. Corral. He was survived by his five children and two grandchildren.

Selected titlesBattle Cry, 1953The Angry Hills, 1955Exodus, 1958Exodus Revisited, 1960 (GB title: In the Steps of Exodus)Mila 18, 1961Armageddon: A Novel of Berlin, 1963Topaz, 1967The Third Temple (with Strike Zion by William Stevenson), 1967QB VII, 1970Ireland, A Terrible Beauty, 1975 (with Jill Uris)Trinity, 1976Jerusalem: A Song of Songs, 1981 (with Jill Uris)The Haj, 1984Mitla Pass, 1988Redemption, 1995A God in Ruins, 1999O'Hara's Choice, 2003

See also
 List of bestselling novels in the United States

 Notes 

References

Further reading
 Ira Nadel. Leon Uris: Life of a Best Seller'' (University of Texas Press; 2010) 376 pages; scholarly biography

External links
Inventory of Leon Uris novel and screenplay manuscripts and other documents
 
 Leon Uris Papers at the Harry Ransom Center
 Jill Uris at LC Authorities, with 3 records

1924 births
2003 deaths
American historical novelists
Novelists from New York (state)
Writers from Baltimore
People from Shelter Island, New York
American people of Polish-Jewish descent
American people of Russian-Jewish descent
American writers of Russian descent
United States Marines
Jewish American military personnel
Baltimore City College alumni
United States Marine Corps personnel of World War II
Deaths from kidney failure
Burials at Quantico National Cemetery
Jewish American novelists
American war novelists
20th-century American novelists
21st-century American novelists
American male novelists
20th-century American male writers
21st-century American male writers
Novelists from Maryland
20th-century American non-fiction writers
21st-century American non-fiction writers
American male non-fiction writers
American expatriates in New Zealand
20th-century American Jews
21st-century American Jews